Albert of Riga or Albert of Livonia or Albrecht (c.1165 – 17 January 1229) was the third Bishop of Riga in Livonia. In 1201 he allegedly founded Riga, the modern capital of Latvia, and built the city's cathedral in 1221.

Albert headed the armed forces that forcibly converted the eastern Baltic region to Catholic faith, in the nature of a crusade that was undertaken while the Fourth Crusade was sacking the Christian Byzantine capital of Constantinople.

Early life 
Albert was born in Bexhövede, a part of Loxstedt, Lower Saxony, Germany. He and his brother Hermann were members of the powerful Buxhoeveden family from Bexhövede. Because of this he has also been known as Albert of Buxhoeveden (or Bexhövede, Buxhövden, Buxhöwde, Buxthoeven, Appeldern).

Albert was a canon in Bremen when his uncle Hartwig, Archbishop of Bremen and Hamburg, named him Bishop of Livonia, provided that he could conquer and hold it, and convince the pagan inhabitants to become Christians. The patent was granted 28 March 1199, and by the beginning of spring 1200 he embarked with a Baltic fleet of 23 vessels and more than 1,500 armed crusaders. He had the support of the Hohenstaufen German King, Philip of Swabia, and the more distant blessing of Pope Innocent III.

In 1200, Bishop Albert led a crusade in Livonia, providing the starting point to create an ecclesiastical State. Albert arrived in his diocese in Ikšķile with a sizeable army. He was able to send reinforcements without asking permission from the Pope. These rights led him to create an annual summer expedition from Lübeck to Livonia called the "perpetual crusade".

Foundation of Riga 
When Albert realized that the diocese of Uexkull was located far away from the Daugava river to be effective, he founded a castle nearer the sea, where a small stream joined the Daugava creating a natural harbor. This castle would be the start of the foundation of Riga.

Together with merchants from the Baltic Sea island of Gotland, Albert founded Riga in 1201, where a small community of Hanseatic traders from Lübeck held a tentative trading encampment. In 1204, he received a papal bull to sign up crusaders.

He successfully converted many Livs under their leader Caupo, offering them protection against neighboring Lithuanian and Estonian tribes; Albert also subjugated Latvian principalities of Koknese, Jersika and Tālava later on. The conquest of Livonia in full occupied almost three decades of his life.

Albert created a military order, the Livonian Brothers of the Sword, and began to build his cathedral in 1215. King Philip made him a Prince of the Holy Roman Empire, with Livonia for a fief, and thus Albert became a "Prince-Bishop". In 1225 King Henry (VII) of Germany confirmed the title of Prince for Albert and his brother, Hermann. Albert declared his diocese independent of Bremen, and later Riga was raised to an archbishopric.

A first-hand account of Albert is in the contemporary Livonian Chronicle of Henry by Henry of Latvia.

Albert died in Riga in 1229. As a Catholic Bishop, he left no descendants. He was venerated as a Catholic saint until the Protestant Reformation. The present-day von Buxhoeveden are descendants of his cousin Johannes von Buxhoeveden. Albert's brother Theodoricus married a niece of the prince of Novgorod Mstislav Mstislavich and is the progenitor of the family de Raupena (de Ropa, known today as "von der Ropp") that founded manors in Livonia and Courland.

Albert Street in Riga is named after Bishop Albert.

References

External links
 Albert von Buxhoeveden 
 James A. Brundage, The Chronicle of Henry of Livonia : edited and translated, 2003
 Catholic Encyclopedia article

1160s births
1229 deaths
Livonian Brothers of the Sword
Prince-bishops in Livonia
People from Cuxhaven (district)
Bishops of Riga
Baltic-German people
12th-century Roman Catholic bishops in Livonia
13th-century Roman Catholic bishops in Livonia
Christians of the Livonian Crusade
Buxhoeveden family